João Pedro Sorgi (born October 18, 1993) is a former Brazilian tennis player. He has a career high ATP singles ranking of No. 251, achieved on 18 September 2017. Sorgi also has a career high ATP doubles ranking of No. 263 achieved on 30 September 2013.

Career 
In May 2011, Sorgi reached the semifinals in Trofeo Bonfiglio (a prestigious junior tennis tournament) after defeating top ranked Dominic Thiem in quarterfinals.
Sorgi reached the final of ten Futures in singles, but has only one title; he won the Brazil F10 in São José do Rio Preto in October 2013. In doubles, he won 17 titles out of 27 finals, including three consecutive titles in three weeks, doing this two times: Egypt F11, F12, F13 (in June 2013) partnering André Miele and Argentina F5, F6, F7 (in May 2016) partnering Marcelo Zormann.

At Challenger level, he reached two finals in doubles, finishing runner-up in both. In singles, he reached a lone final, losing in straight sets to Tennys Sandgren at the Savannah Challenger.

National representation

Davis Cup

Sorgi was first nominated to play for Brazil in Davis Cup in February 2018 against Dominican Republic. Sorgi made his debut in Davis Cup against José Hernández-Fernández but lost in 3 sets. He won the deciding rubber of that tie – against Roberto Cid Subervi – in three sets, which allowed the Brazilian team to advance into the second round, against Colombia. Sorgi reentered against Colombia at the deciding rubber of that tie but lost in straight sets to Alejandro González.

Currently, João Sorgi sports a 1–2 record in Davis Cup matches. He has played only singles matches thus far.

Challenger and Futures finals

Singles: 11 (1–10)

Doubles: 27 (17–10)

References

External links

1993 births
Living people
Sportspeople from São Paulo (state)
Brazilian people of Italian descent
Brazilian male tennis players
People from Sertãozinho